The following article lists the historical military ranks used by personnel of the Swedish Armed Forces.

Ranks 1901–1925 - Army
With the introduction of the conscript system to replace the Swedish allotment system there were initially no changes in the rank structure. 

Överbefäl

Officerare
Fältmarskalk
General
Generallöjtnant
Generalmajor
Överste
Överstelöjtnant
Major
Kapten
Löjtnant
Underlöjtnant
Fänrik (from 1914)

Underbefäl

Underofficerare
Fanjunkare
Sergeant
Manskap
Befäl av manskapet
Distinktionskorpral(to 1914) Furir(from 1914)
Korpral
Vicekorpral
Menig

Conscripted personnel
Conscripts served 8–9 months in the infantry and 12 months in the cavalry and artillery. These personnel carried the rank of menig (private). Later conscripts could also be trained for and given corporal ranks.

Employed personnel

Employed personnel were divided into two groups, överbefäl and underbefäl. Överbefäl consisted of Officerare(Officers) who had a studentexamen (high school degree) and served as cadets for two years at the Karlberg Military Academy before being commissioned. 

Underbefäl were divided into two groups, underofficerare and manskap(enlisted men). The category manskap consisted of the ordinary privates and corporals. The status of the underofficerare was lowered with the introduction of conscription for several reasons. The old system had consisted of the allotment regiments and enlisted troops. The enlisted troops had a much lower status than the allotment soldiers and the new conscription system copied more features from the enlisted part of the army than the allotment part. Earlier, the underofficerare were educated in their own national school and the allotment underofficerare, following French practice, were recruited directly, i.e. they did not have to serve as privates or corporals before they could advance to underofficerare. In the conscription army this practice was ended and like to enlisted troops pre 1901 the underofficerare were all recruited from the manskap category. 

For the enlisted men the start of the military career was as a private after they had signed a three-year contract. The first year was a training year(volontärskola) after which the most able privates could apply (applications were accepted once a year) for corporal school(korpralskola). Those who were not admitted to the corporal school continued to serve as privates or lance corporals (vicekorpral), if they had special skills such as farrier. After their three-year service was finished they could enlist for additional periods, but if they had not been promoted before 28 years of age, they had to quit. Usually, soldiers who had failed to be accepted to corporal school after their first term (i.e. been rejected three times) would choose to serve for one or two years more at most, since the pay and conditions of privates were poor. The main reason such individuals did not quit directly after three years was that after five years of service(later shortened to four) the privates were eligible for extra benefits, e.g., priority for employment in post offices, government-owned railways, police, etc.

Those who were accepted to corporal school were promoted to vicekorpral and after one year of training promoted to korpral. Advancement to corporal meant that one had to serve one additional year (i.e., four years if the corporal did not re enlist). Corporals could apply to furirskola, a one-year training, after which they were promoted to furir. Korpral and furir worked as instructors and squad leaders and had a mandatory retirement age of 32. Enlisted personnel did not receive pension after their service, but they were entitled to severance pay upon discharge.

A furir who had graduated the furirskola with high marks could apply for underofficersskola, after which they were promoted to sergeant. After two years as sergeant they were given a fullmakt(warrant) and were guaranteed employment until retirement, after which they received pension. Underofficerare were responsible for the training of the conscripts and recruits and could also work as platoon leaders or deputy platoon leaders.

Ranks 1901–1925 - Navy

Fleet forces 
Överbefäl
Officerare

 Amiral
 Viceamiral
 Konteramiral
 Kommendör
 Kommendörkapten of the 1st/2nd rank
 Kapten
 Löjtnant
 Underlöjtnant
 Fänrik (from 1914 onward)

Underbefäl

Underofficerare
Fanjunkare
Sergeant
Manskap
Befäl av manskapet
Distinktionskorpral(to 1914) Furir(from 1914)
Korpral
Vicekorpral
Menig

Naval Infantry and Coastal Defense Artillery  
Överbefäl
Officerare
General
Generallöjtnant
Generalmajor
Överste
Överstelöjtnant
Major
Kapten
Löjtnant
Underlöjtnant
Fänrik (from 1914)

Underbefäl
Underofficerare (av 1. graden)
 Styckjunkare
 Flaggjunkare
 Flaggmaskinist
 Flaggrustmästare
 Stabstrumpetare
Underofficerare (av 2. graden)
 Sergeant
 Maskinist
 Rustmästare
 Torpedmästare
 Stabstrumpetare

Manskap
Befäl av manskapet
Distinktionskorpral(to 1914) Furir(from 1914)
Korpral
Vicekorpral
Menig

Ranks 1926–1952- Army and Air Force 

Officerare

Fältmarskalk
General
Generallöjtnant
Generalmajor
Överste
Överstelöjtnant
Major
Kapten
Löjtnant
Underlöjtnant (abolished 1937)
Fänrik

Underofficerare

 Förvaltare(from 1936)
 Fanjunkare
 Sergeant

Manskap

Underbefäl
Överfurir(from 1942)
Furir
Korpral
Vicekorpral
Menig

Employed personnel
In a reform 1926 the Underofficer category was split from underbefäl to form their own corps. A centralised education was reintroduced with the Swedish Army Non-Commissioned Officer School (warrant officer school of the Army) replacing the local education of underofficerare which had taken place since the introduction of the conscript army. In addition to military subjects, the school also gave the students a civilian secondary education. The tjänsteställning (seniority) of fanjunkare was raised to that equal of underlöjtnant. When Förvaltare was introduced in 1936 the rank was given a tjänsteställning equal to löjtnant. Thus many of the grievances regarding the lowered status in 1901 were addressed. In 1949 the possibility to work as underbefäl (manskap higher than menig) on similar terms as officers and warrant officers was introduced. That is, not all corporals had to re-enlist regularly and quit while in their 30s but could work until retirement.

Conscripted personnel
During World War II, there was a serious shortage of officers because of drastic cuts in the 1920s. It was therefore decided to introduce conscript warrant officers(underofficerare). Later conscript officers were introduced with ranks of fänrik to kapten.

Ranks used 1926–1952 - Navy

Fleet forces 
Överbefäl
Officerare

 Amiral
 Viceamiral
 Konteramiral
 Kommendör
 Kommendörkapten of the 1st/2nd rank
 Kapten
 Löjtnant
 Underlöjtnant (abolished in 1937)
 Fänrik

Underbefäl

Underofficerare
Förvaltare(from 1936)
Fanjunkare
Sergeant
Manskap
Befäl av manskapet
Överfurir(from 1942)
Furir
Korpral
Vicekorpral
Sjöman

Naval Infantry and Coastal Defense Artillery  
Överbefäl
Officerare
General
Generallöjtnant
Generalmajor
Överste
Överstelöjtnant
Major
Kapten
Löjtnant
Underlöjtnant (abolished in 1937)
Fänrik

Underbefäl

Underofficerare
Förvaltare(from 1936)
Fanjunkare
Sergeant
Manskap
Befäl av manskapet
Överfurir(from 1942)
Furir
Korpral
Vicekorpral
Menig

Ranks 1953–1972 - Army and Air Force

Officerare

Fältmarskalk (Abolished 1972)
General
Generallöjtnant
Generalmajor
Överste (with higher pay)
Överste
Överstelöjtnant
Major
Kapten
Löjtnant
Fänrik

Underofficerare

 Förvaltare
 Fanjunkare
 Sergeant

Underbefäl

 Rustmästare(from 1957, abolished 1972)
 Överfurir
 Furir
 Korpral
 Vicekorpral(trainee rank)

Menig

Employed personnel
In 1953 the enlistment system was abolished. Instead of starting a military career by enlisting for three years as a private, one was employed as junior NCO in the new underbefäl corps directly after the conscript service with the rank of korpral.(this option was not open to all conscripts) In a reform in 1960 the tjänsteställning of förvaltare was increased to that between kapten and löjtnant, and förvaltare were given the possibility to become company commanders.

Ranks 1953–1972 - Navy

Fleet forces 
Överbefäl
Officerare

 Amiral
 Viceamiral
 Konteramiral
 Kommendör (with higher pay)
 Kommendör
 Kommendörkapten of the 1st/2nd rank
 Kapten
 Löjtnant
 Fänrik

Underbefäl

Underofficerare

 Flaggunderofficer
 Förvaltare
 Fanjunkare
 Sergeant

Underbefäl
 Högbåtsman
 Rustmästare(from 1957, abolished 1972)
 Överfurir
 Furir
 Korpral
 Vicekorpral(trainee rank)

Menig
 Sjöman

Naval Infantry and Coastal Defense Artillery  
Officerare

General
Generallöjtnant
Generalmajor
Överste (with higher pay)
Överste
Överstelöjtnant
Major
Kapten
Löjtnant
Fänrik

Underofficerare

 Förvaltare
 Fanjunkare
 Sergeant

Underbefäl

 Rustmästare(from 1957, abolished 1972)
 Överfurir
 Furir
 Korpral
 Vicekorpral(trainee rank)

Menig
Menig

Ranks 1972–1983 - Army and Air Force 

Regementsofficerare

 General
 Generallöjtnant
 Generalmajor
 Överste av 1. graden
 Överste
 Överstelöjtnant
 Major
 Kapten
 Löjtnant

Kompaniofficerare

 Kapten
 Löjtnant
 Fänrik

Plutonsofficerare

 Fanjunkare
 Sergeant

Gruppbefäl

Överfurir
Furir
Korpral

Menig

Employed personnel
In 1972, the three corps were renamed; officers who had studied at the Military Academy were now known as regementsofficerare and started at the rank of löjtnant instead of fänrik. The Swedish Army Non-Commissioned Officer School was renamed Swedish Army Company Officer School and those who were trained there started with a rank of fänrik and were joined together with the former underofficerare in the category Kompaniofficerare(Company officers). The former warrant officers were given ranks fänrik to kapten based on their time in service. Kompaniofficerare had the same rank insignia and tjänsteställning as ordinary officers, however they could not advance further in rank. Someone who had been a Sergeant for more than 7 years became Kapten but could not be promoted to Major. The tjänsteställning of the ranks sergeant and fanjunkare was reduced and the ranks were given to former underbefäl with long time in service in a new category Plutonsofficerare. Junior underbefäl were called gruppbefäl and used the ranks previously used by underbefäl. There was still several separate corps with different educational background, different duties and they did not use the same mess, even though they in some cases shared the same rank.

Ranks 1983-2008 - Army and Air Force

Yrkesofficerare

General

Generallöjtnant

Generalmajor

Brigadgeneral (from 2000)

Överste av 1. graden (no new appointments since 2000)

Överste

Överstelöjtnant

Major

Kapten

Löjtnant

Fänrik

Värnpliktigt befäl

Fanjunkare

Sergeant

Överfurir

Furir

Korpral

Menig

Employed personnel
In 1983 the Consolidated Officer System was introduced, in which the different corps were merged to one(Yrkesofficerare) and former plutonsofficerare were also given officer ranks. The separate paths were abolished and all officers had the same education and training and started as fänrik.

Conscripted personnel
Conscript NCOs were continued and since all holders of the ranks were conscripts the name was changed to Värnpliktigt befäl(Värnplikt = conscription) After 1991 only temporary appointments were made to the ranks överfurir and fanjunkare.

History of other ranks
These historical enlisted and NCO ranks of Sweden comprise the contracted ordinary ranks in the Swedish Armed Forces and their respective insignia. The length of contract is currently restricted to two years due to the employment protection law (LAS).

Menig
Rank for recruits undertaking training.

Menig 1:a klass
Menig 1:a klass is a new rank introduced 2009 for soldiers who have spent at least one year in training and service. Bars will increase by one after each year in service, up to a maximum of four bars.

Prior to 2009

Vicekorpral
Vicekorpral was introduced in 2009. How to obtain the rank and what it represents have not yet been clearly defined.

Prior to 1972 
The rank existed until 1972 as a trainee rank for conscripts who were undertaking training to become deputy squad leaders or squad leaders.

Korpral
Korpral used to be a trainee rank for conscripts prior the rank reform 2009 and the change to a pure professional armed forces in 2010. The rank was obtained by conscript commanders after serving a certain time (usually 4 months) and passing the mandatory tests (such as physical, weapons, enemy identification and tactics etc.).

Prior to 2009

1600 - 1700
A korpral of the infantry was in charge of a 24 men strong formation called korpralskap during the Swedish allotment system. The korpralskap consisted of four rote (teams) of 6 men each. Each rote was led by a rote master.

Reform 1833/37
Korpral was considered an under-officer rank in the Cavalry before the reorganization 1833/37 that elevated holders of the rank Korpral to Sergeants and lowered the status of the rank.

Konstapel
A corresponding artillery and air-defense rank that was established in 1500. The rank  was discontinued in 1972.

Distinktionskorpral
Established 1858 as a rank above Korpral. In 1912 the rank  was discontinued and holders of the rank were elevated to Furir.

Sweden: Reform 1972
Holders of the rank Korpral were elevated to Furir.
Holders of the rank Vicekorpral were elevated to Korpral.
Vicekopral   was discontinued.

Sergeant
Sergeant is a rank for soldiers in the cavalry, deputy squanders in regular units and is being used as a rank for deputy squad leaders in the home defense organization(Hemvarnet). The rank was obtained by conscript platoon-commanders (PB, plutonsbefäl) when finishing their conscript service (usually after 12 months). How to obtain the rank in the newly formed professional armed forces is not yet clearly defined.

2009 Furir changes name to Sergeant 
The rank  Sergeant changed name to First Sergeant and Furir to Sergeant.

Furir
Furir (from French fourrier means the person responsible for the feeding) was a Swedish military rank above Korpral and Sergeant (now First Sergeant) awarded after completing the training for company commander (KB, kompanibefäl), level 8 conscript training (usually after 15 months). Level 8 means that the holder has received some basic leadership training at team leader level. Riflemen, MP men and deputy team-leaders (5 men) of cavalry and riflemen at the Nordic Battle Group typically have this rank [ref: K3, K3, K1, NBG]. Other holders of the rank are the deputy team-leaders of the Home Guard.

Origin 1600
The responsibility of a furir was to arrange for housing as well as the distribution of food in a Company.

1833/37
The rank becomes the lowest underofficers rank.

1875
Holders of the rank Furir were elevated to Sergeant and the rank was removed.

1914
The rank was reintroduced, not categorized as underofficer, but as a rank for senior squad leaders and instructors.

1944
Establishment of the rank Överfurir above Furir. The rank corresponds to the newly introduced rank Swedish rank First Sergeant. Removed 1983 as a professional rank.

2009
The rank changes name to Sergeant

Rank inflation

Reform 1972 - Rank inflation phase I 
Prior to 1972, military personnel were divided into three categories Underbefäl (non-commissioned officers), Underofficerare (warrant officers) and Officerare (commissioned officers). The reform established a four-career-path system with four categories as described below and carried out major promotions of most personnel below the rank Överstelöjtnant.

The Underbefäl category was split into two categories 
 gruppbefäl to include
 korpral - former vicekorpral
 furir - former korpral
 överfurir - former furir
 plutonsofficerare to include
 sergeant - former överfurir
 fanjunkare - former elderly överfurir and rustmästare
The Underofficer category was renamed kompaniofficerare to include
 fänrik - former sergeant and fanjunkare with less than 3 years of service
 löjtnant - former sergeant and fanjunkare with 3-7 years of service
 kapten - former sergeant, fanjunkare with a minimum of 7 years of service and förvaltare
The Officer category was renamed regementsofficerare to include 
 löjtnant - Löjtnant with less than 3 years of service and former fänrik
 kapten - kapten with less than 11 years of service and former Löjtnant with 3-11 years of service
 major - former kapten and löjtnant with a minimum of 11 years of service
 överstelöjtnant - överstelöjtnant and former major
 higher ranks

Reform 1983 - Rank inflation phase II 
All categories were merged into one professional officer category with the lowest rank set to fänrik. Furir, överfurir, sergeant and fanjunkare were removed as a professional ranks. Holders of the rank fanjunkare were promoted to löjtnant and the rest to fänrik.

See also
 Military ranks of the Swedish Armed Forces

Bibliography 
The Swedish Armed Forces official website - military ranks  (accessed on July 13, 2007) (in Swedish)
http://www.goarmy.com/about/ranks_and_insignia.jsp USA enlisted ranks

 
Military insignia